Edward Radclyffe, 6th Earl of Sussex (c. 1559 – August 1643) was an English politician who sat in the House of Commons between 1586 and 1611 and later succeeded to a peerage.

Biography 
Radclyffe was the son of Sir Humphrey Radclyffe and his wife Isabel Harvey. He was the grandson of Robert Radcliffe, 1st Earl of Sussex and Elizabeth Stafford, Countess of Sussex. 

In 1586, he was elected Member of Parliament for Petersfield. He was elected MP for Bedfordshire in 1588 and for Portsmouth in 1593. He was elected MP for Bedfordshire again in 1597, 1601 and 1604. He was appointed Sheriff of Bedfordshire in 1598.

Radclyffe was knighted around 1594 and inherited the earldom from his cousin Robert Radclyffe, 5th Earl of Sussex in 1629.

Radclyffe had married three times: first, Elizabeth Petre, the daughter of Sir William Petre of Ingatestone, Essex and widow of John Gostwick of Willington; secondly (1594) Jane, daughter of Francis Hynde of Madingley, Cambridgeshire and widow of John Catesby of Newnham in Goldington; and thirdly (1634) Eleanor, the daughter of Sir Richard Wortley of Wortley, Yorkshire and the widow of Sir Henry Lee, Bt., of Quarrendon, Buckinghamshire. Eleanor outlived him by many years and made two further marriages. He died impoverished and intestate. The earldom became extinct.

References

Earls of Sussex (1529 creation)
1550s births
1643 deaths
16th-century English nobility
17th-century English nobility
Edward
High Sheriffs of Bedfordshire
English MPs 1586–1587
English MPs 1589
English MPs 1593
English MPs 1597–1598
English MPs 1601
English MPs 1604–1611